The 500 metres speed skating event was part of the speed skating at the 1952 Winter Olympics programme. The competition was held on Saturday, 16 February 1952, at 3p.m. Forty-one speed skaters from 14 nations competed.

Medalists

Records
These were the standing world and Olympic records (in seconds) prior to the 1952 Winter Olympics.

(*) The record was set in a high altitude venue (more than 1000 metres above sea level) and on naturally frozen ice.

Results

The current world record holder Yuri Sergeev did not compete as the Soviet Union did not participate in Winter Games before 1956.

Finn Helgesen did not receive a bronze medal because he was paired up with Arne Johansen and finished behind his opponent.

Jan Charisius and Lassi Parkkinen gave up after a fall.

References

External links
Official Olympic Report
 

Speed skating at the 1952 Winter Olympics